The Nuraghe Adoni is a Nuragic complex dating back to the Bronze Age located in the municipality of Villanova Tulo in the province of Cagliari. The site is located on a hill at the center of the historic region of Sarcidano.

The first excavations of the site date back to the mid-nineteenth century and were resumed several times in the nineties of the twentieth century. The entire complex consists of a nuraghe composed by a central tower and a quatrefoil bastion, surrounded by a village. At the site there were found several artifacts such as ceramics and a fragment of a bronze loop of the Schnabelkanne type.

Gallery

References
Sardegna cultura , Villanova Tulo - Complesso di Adoni

Buildings and structures in Sardinia
Archaeological sites in Sardinia
Former populated places in Italy
Tourist attractions in Sardinia
Nuraghe